Anarkophobia is the fifth studio album by the  Brazilian band, Ratos de Porão, simply known as RxDxPx. Although a hardcore punk band in its early days, since the previous album RDP had been adding new influences, and Anarkophobia falls much more into the crossover thrash genre. It was released in 1991 by Roadrunner Records and follows the band's breakthrough record from 1989, Brasil. Like its predecessor, it was recorded in Berlin, Germany, and was produced by Harris Johns.

Overview
Musically, the album shows more of a slant towards thrash metal than hardcore punk as the band's popularity grew, although it did include a cover version of "Commando" by The Ramones as a reminder of its punk rock roots.

The lyrics are socio-political – more akin to hardcore punk – and it was released with two versions, one in Portuguese and another in English with an emerging American and an "out of Brazil better understanding" interest in mind.

Track listing

Credits
 João Gordo – lead vocals
 Jão – guitar
 Jabá – bass guitar
 Spaghetti – drums
 Recorded at Music Lab Studio, Berlin, Germany
 Produced by Harris Johns
 Engineered by Angelo Platte
 Cover art by Marcatti

References

1991 albums
Ratos de Porão albums
Roadrunner Records albums
Albums produced by Harris Johns